The 2004 Armenian Cup was the 13th edition of the Armenian Cup, a football competition. In 2004, the tournament had 18 participants, out of which 3 were reserve teams.

Results

Preliminary round

The matches were played on 10 March 2004.

|}

First round

The first legs were played on 14 and 15 March 2004. The second legs were played on 18 and 19 March 2004.

|}

Quarter-finals

The first legs were played on 22 March 2004. The second legs were played on 26 March 2004.

|}

Semi-finals

The first legs were played on 3 April 2005. The second legs were played on 21 April 2005.

|}

Final

See also
 2004 Armenian Premier League

External links
 2004 Armenian Cup at rsssf.com

Armenian Cup seasons
Armenia
Armenian Cup, 2004